Ectoedemia asiatica is a moth of the family Nepticulidae. It was described by R.K. Puplesis in 1988. It is known from Tajikistan.

References

Nepticulidae
Moths of Asia
Moths described in 1988